Volbeat are  a Danish rock band formed in Copenhagen in 2001. They play a fusion of rock and roll, heavy metal, and rockabilly. Their current line-up consists of vocalist and guitarist Michael Poulsen, guitarist Rob Caggiano, drummer Jon Larsen and bassist Kaspar Boye Larsen. The band is signed to Dutch label Mascot Records and has released eight studio albums and one DVD. Their second album Rock the Rebel/Metal the Devil received platinum status, and their 2010 release Beyond Hell/Above Heaven was subject to widespread international critical acclaim, receiving triple platinum in Denmark and Austria, double platinum in Sweden, platinum in Canada, 5x Gold in Germany, and gold in Finland and the United States.  Volbeat's seventh album, Rewind, Replay, Rebound, was released on 2 August 2019. Their eighth album, Servant of the Mind, was released on 3 December 2021.

History

Early years (2001–2009)

Singer Michael Poulsen's first band was death metal act, Dominus. In 2000, Poulsen became fed up with the death metal music scene, causing Dominus to break up. In 2001, Poulsen went on to form a new band with some friends and other former Dominus members. This was the beginning of Volbeat.

The band name "Volbeat" was derived from Dominus's third album name, Vol.Beat (read as: Volume Beat). After selling 1,000 copies of their Beat the Meat demo tape, Volbeat was signed to a record deal by Rebel Monster Records, a sub-label of Mascot Records.

Volbeat released their first album, The Strength/The Sound/The Songs in 2005. The line-up for the album consisted of Michael Poulsen (vocals), Jon Larsen (drums), Franz Gottschalk (guitar) and Anders Kjølholm (bass). The album was a huge success in Denmark achieving a spot at No. 18 in the charts. Critics were generally positive towards The Strength / The Sound / The Songs. The German hard rock magazine RockHard gave it 10/10 in a review. The Strength / The Sound / The Songs also received a handful of awards, including Best Album in the Danish Metal Musik Awards in 2005. Volbeat was praised for its live performances. Their concert at Roskilde Festival 2006 received a 6/6 stars review in the Danish newspaper BT.

The band, featuring the same line-up as their first album, released their second album, Rock the Rebel/Metal the Devil, in week 8 of 2007, where it debuted as No. 1 in the Danish Top 40 for CD-sales.

They opened the Roskilde Festival in 2007 and also supported Metallica together with Mnemic at their concert in Denmark 13 July of that year. They were to support Megadeth in Finland and in their home town, Copenhagen, and to make a few festival appearances mid-2008. They hired Thomas Bredahl following the recording of Rock the Rebel / Metal the Devil as a replacement for Gottschalk on guitar.

In 2008, Volbeat released their third album, Guitar Gangsters & Cadillac Blood featuring guitarist Thomas Bredahl. It topped the Finnish Album Chart straight after its publication. In 2009, Volbeat supported the symphonic metal band Nightwish on their U.S tour in May. On 31 May 2009 they were on the main stage of the Pinkpop Festival. They also supported Metallica on the North American leg of Metallica's World Magnetic Tour from October to December 2009.
In 2009 the band played at the biggest open-air festival in Europe (400,000–500,000 rock fans every year), Przystanek Woodstock in Poland.

Line-up changes (2010–2015) 

Poulsen stated about Beyond Hell/Above Heaven, "The album title refers to the overall theme of the album, and it continues the storyline from where Guitar Gangsters & Cadillac Blood left off...".

On 25 January 2010, it was confirmed that Volbeat would be performing at Download Festival in June 2010. It was also confirmed that Volbeat were to join Metallica, Megadeth, Anthrax, Slayer and others in the "Big Four" show at Sonisphere Switzerland. It was also announced that the new album, Beyond Hell/Above Heaven was to be released on 10 September 2010. The band also announced their "Beyond Hell/Above Heaven Live 2010" tour. In 2011, Volbeat announced their Grand Summer Tour across North America. The tour began in Toronto, Ontario on 24 July at Heavy T.O., and concluded with a two-night stand on 3 & 4 September at the House of Blues in Anaheim, CA. Volbeat co-headlined this tour with rock powerhouse Cold on all US dates, but not in Canada. On 28 November 2011, Volbeat announced the departure of Bredahl via their website. Volbeat committed to playing all 2011-2012 as scheduled either as a trio, or with a replacement guitarist. On 26 January 2012, Volbeat joined Megadeth, Motörhead, and Lacuna Coil on Gigantour. The tour started in Camden, New Jersey, and culminated on 28 February 2012 in Denver, Colorado, at The Fillmore Auditorium. On the tour, Hank Shermann (Mercyful Fate) filled in as the guitarist for Volbeat. On their North American Summer tour, which began in June 2012, Iced Earth and Hellyeah were the supporting acts. The tour included dates in Baltimore, Toronto, Detroit, Billings, Boston, Tempe, San Francisco, and Weyburn and Lazerfest in Boone, Iowa, and in June, Orion Music Festival, headlined by Metallica, at Bader Field in Atlantic City, New Jersey.

Volbeat were confirmed to be playing Download festival June 2013. Volbeat announced in December that their new album would be released in 2013. A spring tour with Danko Jones and Spoken was announced in December. In January 2013, Volbeat revealed the name of the new album, Outlaw Gentlemen & Shady Ladies, and that was released in the spring of 2013.

On 4 February 2013, it was announced that Rob Caggiano, formerly of Anthrax, had officially joined the band as second guitarist. He had been producing and recording guest solos on the band's upcoming album, Outlaw Gentlemen and Shady Ladies, which the band also announced will be released on 8 April 2013 (GSA on 5 April and US on 9 April), before being asked to join as a full-time member. Singer and guitarist Michael Poulsen said of the chemistry between Caggiano and the rest of the band "The collaboration with Rob in the studio was so inspiring and in good spirit that we the decided to keep him. Basically we went into the studio as a three piece and came out as a whole band!"

Michael Poulsen confirmed during the band's 2015 tour with Anthrax and Crobot, that a new album was in the works, hinting that it would be released in 2016, and demoed a new song throughout "The Devil's Bleeding Crown" tour.

In April 2015, singer Poulsen revealed that he had so far written seven songs for the next album. In November 2015, the band announced that Kjølholm would leave Volbeat. They emphasised, that he left in good terms with the band. Poulsen and Larsen said that "Anders has been a loyal friend and bandmate since 2001. ... We're very thankful for this and wish Anders all the best in the future." Kjølholm likewise wished all the best for the rest of the band.

Recent works (2016–present) 

On 3 April 2016, Volbeat posted a teaser for their upcoming album. On 7 April 2016, they revealed Seal the Deal and Let's Boogie to be released on 3 June 2016. The album's first single was "The Devil's Bleeding Crown". The official music video for this song was released on 13 May 2016. The second single, released 29 April 2016, was "For Evigt" (Forever), and an English version, "The Bliss". Kaspar Boye Larsen was announced as the band's new bassist on 13 May 2016. The band toured the United Kingdom in 2016 with Alter Bridge, Gojira, and Like a Storm. The band was an opening act on Metallica's WorldWired Tour 2017 stadium tour in the US, alongside Avenged Sevenfold.

In 2018, Volbeat announced plans for a seventh album. On 4 March 2019 Volbeat were announced, along with Gojira and Behemoth, as supporting acts for Slipknot's Knotfest Roadshow North American tour. On 10 May 2019, Volbeat released a 40-second song, "Parasite", and on 15 May, they released the second single, "Leviathan", from their seventh studio album, Rewind, Replay, Rebound while announcing the 14-song tracklist and a release date of 2 August 2019. They released the third single off the album, "Last Day Under the Sun" on 13 June 2019. On 18 July 2019, the band released the fourth single, "Cheapside Sloggers", featuring Gary Holt of Slayer. On 26 July 2019, the band released the fifth single, "Pelvis on Fire". On 4 November 2019, the band released "Die to Live", featuring Neil Fallon of Clutch as the sixth single. 

On 2 June 2021, the band released two singles, "Wait a Minute My Girl" and "Dagen Før", the latter featuring Alphabeat's Stine Bramsen. "Wait a Minute My Girl" earned the band their ninth No. 1 on Billboards Mainstream Rock Airplay chart dated for 21 August 2021. The band is now tied for the 10th-most No. 1s in the chart's 40-year history. 

The band contributed a cover of the Metallica song "Don't Tread on Me" to the charity tribute album The Metallica Blacklist, released in September 2021. On 23 September 2021, the band released a new song "Shotgun Blues". Along with the release, the band confirmed the release of their eighth studio album Servant of the Mind for 3 December 2021. In September 2021, the band announced a 2022 co-headline with Ghost. On 28 October 2021, the band released the fourth single from their new album, "Becoming". On 11 November 2021, the band released a music video for the song "Shotgun Blues". 

On 28 January 2022, it was announced that the band's drummer, Jon Larsen, tested positive for COVID-19. As a result, the band had to cancel one show. The band also announced that they would continue with their tour with Ghost, and the former drummer of Slayer, Jon Dette would fill in as a touring drummer until Larsen's return.

On 13 April 2022, the band released a music video for the song "Temple Of Ekur".

Recognition

The Strength / The Sound / The Songs won the award for the best debut album at the Danish Metal Music Awards 2005.
Volbeat won the award Steppeulven for hope of the year 2006.
Volbeat won the award for the best live band at the Danish Metal Music Awards 2006 voted by fans.
Rock the Rebel / Metal the Devil won the award for best album at the Danish Metal Music Awards 2007.
Volbeat won the Danish radio award for P3 listener hit at the P3 Guld-show voted by listeners of P3.
Volbeat were nominated for the Grammy Award for Best Metal Performance for "Room 24".

Musical style and influences
The band's musical style has been described as heavy metal, hard rock, rockabilly, psychobilly, groove metal, and rock and roll. Chris True of AllMusic stated, "[the band's] sound weds hard rock, classic metal, glam, punk, and rockabilly." Some of the band's influences include Elvis Presley, Johnny Cash, Metallica, Black Sabbath, Obituary, Mercyful Fate, Darkthrone, Mayhem, King Diamond, Dio, Iced Earth, Death, Armored Saint, Iron Maiden, Judas Priest, Accept, Cannibal Corpse, Manowar, AC/DC, and Social Distortion.

Band members

Current members
 Michael Poulsen – lead vocals, rhythm guitar (2001–present), lead guitar (2011–2013)
 Jon Larsen – drums (2001–present)
 Rob Caggiano – lead guitar, backing vocals (2013–present), bass (2016)
 Kaspar Boye Larsen – bass, backing vocals (2016–present)

Former members
 Anders Kjølholm – bass, backing vocals (2001–2015)
 Teddy Vang – lead guitar (2001–2002)
 Franz "Hellboss" Gottschalk – lead guitar, backing vocals (2002–2006)
 Thomas Bredahl – lead guitar, backing vocals (2006–2011)

Touring musicians
 Jon Dette – drums (2022)

Timeline

Discography

 The Strength/The Sound/The Songs (2005)
 Rock the Rebel/Metal the Devil (2007)
 Guitar Gangsters & Cadillac Blood (2008)
 Beyond Hell/Above Heaven (2010)
 Outlaw Gentlemen & Shady Ladies (2013)
 Seal the Deal & Let's Boogie (2016)
 Rewind, Replay, Rebound (2019)
 Servant of the Mind (2021)

Videography
 Live: Sold Out (2008)
 Live from Beyond Hell/Above Heaven (2011)
 Let's Boogie! Live from Telia Parken (2018)

Tours
 Guitar Gangsters & Cadillac Blood Tour (2008-2009)
 Beyond Hell/Above Heaven Tour (2010-2012)
 Outlaw Gentlemen & Shady Ladies Tour (2013-2015)
 Seal The Deal & Let's Boogie Tour (2016-2017)
 Rewind, Replay, Rebound Tour (2019)
 Servant Of The Road (2022)

References

External links

 
 

 
Alternative metal musical groups
Danish hard rock musical groups
Danish heavy metal musical groups
Danish thrash metal musical groups
Groove metal musical groups
Musical groups established in 2001
Musical quartets
Rockabilly music groups